Judex is a 1934 French crime film directed by Maurice Champreux and starring René Ferté, Louise Lagrange and Paule Andral. It features the hero Judex.

Cast
 René Ferté as Judex  
 Louise Lagrange as Jacqueline  
 Paule Andral as Madame de Trémeuse 
 Marcel Vallée as Cocantin  
 Alexandre Mihalesco as Le banquier Favraux  
 Jean Lefebvre as Roger de Trémeuse  
 René Navarre as Kerjean  
 Blanche Bernis as Diana Monti  
 Jean Borelli as Le petit Jean  
 Nino Constantini as Moralès  
 Madeleine Guitty as La bonne de Cocantin 
 Raymond Blot
 Yvette Dantin
 Charles Lemontier
 Aya Valmita
 Le Petit Patachou as Le môme Réglisse

References

Bibliography 
 Hardy, Phil. The BFI Companion to Crime. A&C Black, 1997.

External links 
 

1934 films
French crime films
1934 crime films
1930s French-language films
Films directed by Maurice Champreux
French black-and-white films
1930s French films